Just Be My Lady is an album by the American R&B and funk musician Larry Graham, released in 1981. Graham re-recorded the title track for his 1998 album, GCS 2000.

The album peaked at No. 46 on the Billboard 200. It peaked at No. 8 on the Billboard Top Black Albums chart.

Production
Graham continued to move away from funk music, putting more emphasis on his R&B ballads. He produced the album, and played almost all of the instruments. "Guess Who" is a cover of the Jesse Belvin song.

Critical reception

The Washington Informer thought that "Graham has established himself as a vocal personality that rivals, perhaps overshadows, his instrumental personality—one drips with tenderness while the other booms furiously." Stereo Review called the album "a set of slow ballads oozed out in Lou Rawls-like low gear."

AllMusic wrote that "some selections are shaded with Graham's doo wop and gospel influence, and all have much appeal." Dave Marsh, in The New Rolling Stone Record Guide, dismissed Graham as "one of those lugubriously philosophizing soul crooners."

Track listing

Personnel
Larry Graham - lead and backing vocals, bass, drums, guitar, keyboards, arrangements
Wilton Rabb - guitar, backing vocals
Eric Daniels - keyboards, backing vocals
Noel Closson - drums on "Our Love Keeps Growing Strong", "Our Love Keeps Growing Strong" and "Feels Like Love"
Carroll Stephens - strings
Technical
Tina Graham - production assistance, backing vocals

References

1981 albums
Warner Records albums